Daniel Anthony Feetham KC MP is a Gibraltarian politician and lawyer who served as Leader of the Opposition and Leader of the Gibraltar Social Democrats (GSD) from 2013 to 2017.

Political career 
Mr Feetham was one of the founders of the Gibraltar Labour Party in 2001.  The Gibraltar Labour Party has since merged with the Gibraltar Social Democrats.

He obtained a history degree from the University of Reading and a law degree from the University of Manchester.  He is a barrister in England and Gibraltar and a Member of the Gibraltar Parliament.  From 2004 to 2006 he was a member of the Gibraltar delegation that negotiated a new Constitution with the UK and co-ordinated the yes vote campaign in the referendum on the new Constitution in 2006. The new Constitution was adopted in Gibraltar in 2007.

He served as Gibraltar's first Minister of Justice from 2007-2011. In the 2011 general election the GSD was defeated by a very narrow margin but Mr Feetham was elected to Parliament 52 votes behind the then leader Peter Caruana. Mr Feetham became deputy leader of the GSD in 2012 and in February 2013 he was elected as leader of the GSD and became Leader of the Opposition until June 2017 when he stepped aside for family reasons.

On 2 November 2010, Mr Feetham was stabbed in the back while out walking in Library Street with his children. Police arrested the attacker while the Minister underwent emergency surgery in St. Bernard's Hospital. His attacker was on bail at the time on charges of attempted murder of a doctor at St Bernard's Hospital and stabbed Mr Feetham because he had been declined, by a judge, legal aid to retain an English QC to represent him rather than having local representation. The knife attack cut his spleen in half which had to be removed. Despite the serious nature of the attack Mr Feetham survived.  The attacker is serving a life sentence.

Daniel Feetham was appointed one of Her Majesty's Counsel in December 2016.

Elections 
In 2003, he contested the General Election as leader of the Gibraltar Labour Party.

In 2007, he contested the General Election as a candidate for the Gibraltar Social Democrats. He was elected as an MP and as Minister for Justice.

In 2013, he contested the leadership of the GSD after Peter Caruana stood down. He beat his opponent Damon Bossino and was elected GSD Leader and subsequently as Leader of the Opposition.

See also 
 List of Gibraltarians
 Politics of Gibraltar

References 

Living people
21st-century Gibraltarian lawyers
Gibraltar Socialist Labour Party politicians
Gibraltar Labour Party politicians
Gibraltar Social Democrats politicians
Justice ministers of Gibraltar
Year of birth missing (living people)